Weihenstephan is a part of Freising north of Munich, Germany. It is located on the Weihenstephan Hill, named after the Weihenstephan Abbey, in the west of the city.

Weihenstephan is known for:
 the Benedictine Weihenstephan Abbey, founded 725, which established the oldest still-operating brewery in the world in 1040 (see History of beer). The brewery is now a company called Bayerische Staatsbrauerei Weihenstephan (Bavarian State Brewery Weihenstephan,  i.e. it is owned by the State of Bavaria) and closely related to the Technical University of Munich (TUM) and its graduate studies program for brewing and beverage manufacturing.
 the site of one of the four campuses of the Technical University of Munich, namely the School of Life Sciences
 the Hochschule Weihenstephan-Triesdorf
 the Sichtungsgarten Weihenstephan, a notable horticultural garden

References

Freising (district)
1040s establishments in the Holy Roman Empire
History of Bavaria
History of Altbayern